Jining railway station is a third-class railway station in Jining District, Ulanqab, Inner Mongolia. It opened in 1953. The station only handles freight, there are no passenger services.

See also 

 Jining South railway station
 Ulanqab railway station

References

Railway stations in Inner Mongolia
Railway stations in China opened in 1953